Klochki is a rural locality (a selo) in Rebrikhinsky District of Altai Krai, Russia. Population: 1,105 (2009 est.).

External links
Official website of Klochkovskaya Secondary School 

Rural localities in Rebrikhinsky District